James Maurice Ealum (born December 30, 1930) was an American diplomat who was a career Foreign Service Officer. He served as Chargé d'Affaires ad interim in Afghanistan from March 1986 until September 1987.

Ealum was born in Altus, Oklahoma on December 30, 1930. He was the first diplomat-in-residence at Oklahoma State University–Stillwater.

References

1930 births
Living people
20th-century American diplomats
Ambassadors of the United States to Afghanistan
United States Foreign Service personnel